Southeast University is a university in Nanjing, Jiangsu, China.

Southeast University may also refer to:
National Southeast University, now Nanjing University
Southeast University (Bangladesh), a university in Banani, Dhaka, Bangladesh

See also
Southeastern University (disambiguation)